Lachlan Keeffe (born 14 April 1990) is a professional Australian rules footballer playing for the Greater Western Sydney Giants in the Australian Football League (AFL). He previously played for the Collingwood Football Club from 2009 to 2017.

Early life
Keeffe was born and raised in Gympie, Queensland, and spent some time as a boarder at Marist College Ashgrove and grew up playing soccer, playing under 17 as a soccer midfielder he was first scouted by Collingwood.

AFL Career
In 2008, Keeffe was signed by the Collingwood Football Club as an unregistered player and was later drafted with pick number 69 in the 2009 Rookie Draft. He played for Old Trinity in the VAFA to develop his game during this time.

In 2009, Keeffe played 20 games for Collingwood's reserves team in the VFL. After two seasons at VFL level, Keeffe earned a promotion to the club's senior list for 2011.

In 2011, Keeffe played in Collingwood's NAB Cup pre-season campaign, including the winning Pre Season Grand Final win against Essendon. Keeffe made his senior AFL debut against North Melbourne in round 16, 2011 at the MCG.

Keeffe played the first 9 games of the 2012 season, however, he required a knee reconstruction after round 9. Keeffe made his return to AFL ranks the next year in the round 17 loss to Gold Coast.

Keeffe, along with teammate Josh Thomas, tested positive to the banned substance clenbuterol in drug tests taken in February 2015. Both players accepted provisional suspensions in March 2015. On 10 August 2015, Thomas accepted his two-year ban from the tribunal and that day was delisted by Collingwood football club but was told he'd be re-drafted as a rookie for the 2017 season if still available  in the draft. He was banned from AFL competition until 9 February 2017

On 26 July 2015, teammate Travis Cloke revealed that Keeffe was interested in taking up a role as an NFL punter, and he would soon be travelling to the United States.

On 27 November 2015, Keefe and his teammate Josh Thomas were re-drafted to Collingwood through the rookie draft.

At the conclusion of the 2017 season, Keeffe was delisted by Collingwood. He was subsequently signed by the Greater Western Sydney Giants as a delisted free agent in November.

Statistics
 Statistics are correct to the end of the 2017 season

|- style="background-color: #eaeaea"
! scope="row" style="text-align:center" | 2011
|  || 23 || 5 || 4 || 3 || 29 || 13 || 42 || 19 || 4 || 0.8 || 0.6 || 5.8 || 2.6 || 8.4 || 4.8 || 0.8
|- 
! scope="row" style="text-align:center" | 2012
|  || 23 || 9 || 1 || — || 69 || 31 || 100 || 42 || 11 || 0.1 || — || 7.7 || 3.4 || 11.1|| 4.7 || 1.2
|- style="background:#eaeaea;"
! scope="row" style="text-align:center" | 2013
|  || 23 || 8 || 1 || — || 65 || 33 || 98 || 40 || 11 || 0.1 || — || 8.1 || 4.1 || 12.2 || 5 || 1.4
|- 
! scope="row" style="text-align:center" | 2014
|  || 23 || 18 || 1 || — || 146 || 70 || 216 || 71 || 20 || 0.1 || — || 8.1 || 3.9 || 12 || 3.9 || 1.1

|- style="background:#eaeaea;"
! scope="row" style="text-align:center" | 2017
|  || 23 || 0 || — || — || — || — || — || — || — || — || — || — || — || — || — || —
|- class="sortbottom"
! colspan=3| Career
! 40
! 7
! 3
! 309
! 147
! 456
! 172
! 46
! 0.2
! 0.1
! 7.7
! 3.7
! 11.4
! 4.3
! 1.2
|}

References

External links

 
 

1990 births
Living people
Collingwood Football Club players
Greater Western Sydney Giants players
Australian rules footballers from Queensland
Doping cases in Australian rules football